The Colvin Center is a student recreation center at Oklahoma State University in Stillwater, Oklahoma. It offers  of recreational space. The Colvin Center serves an average of 4,000 students a day.  Admission to the Colvin Center is free to Oklahoma State students, although every OSU student pays a fee along with their tuition towards maintenance of the center.

History
The Colvin Center was originally completed on March 1, 1969, at a cost of almost $3 million. In 1999, student government representatives had become concerned that the aging Colvin Center was becoming increasingly outdated and incapable of meeting the needs of a much larger student body. This movement would later give way to a massive two-year, $23 million renovation and expansion project that was completed in July 2004. Other amenities include an indoor pool and outdoor pool, dance studios,  climbing wall, indoor jogging tracks, racquetball courts, and cardio and fitness equipment.

In 2005, the Colvin Center was named as one of the top six collegiate sports centers in the United States by the National Intramural and Recreational Sports Association.

References

Oklahoma State University
Buildings and structures in Stillwater, Oklahoma
University and college student recreation centers in the United States
1969 establishments in Oklahoma
Sports venues completed in 1969